A mouse (: mice) is a small rodent. Characteristically, mice are known to have a pointed snout, small rounded ears, a body-length scaly tail, and a high breeding rate. The best known mouse species is the common house mouse (Mus musculus). Mice are also popular as pets. In some places, certain kinds of field mice are locally common. They are known to invade homes for food and shelter. 

Mice are typically distinguished from rats by their size. Generally, when a muroid rodent is discovered, its common name includes the term mouse if it is smaller, or rat if it is larger. The common terms rat and mouse are not taxonomically specific. Typical mice are classified in the genus Mus, but the term mouse is not confined to members of Mus and can also apply to species from other genera such as the deer mouse, Peromyscus.

Domestic mice sold as pets often differ substantially in size from the common house mouse. This is attributable to breeding and different conditions in the wild. The best-known strain of mouse is the white lab mouse. It has more uniform traits that are appropriate to its use in research.

Cats, wild dogs, foxes, birds of prey, snakes and even certain kinds of arthropods have been known to prey heavily upon mice. Despite this, mice populations remain plentiful. Due to its remarkable adaptability to almost any environment, the mouse is one of the most successful mammalian genera living on Earth today.

In certain contexts, mice can be considered vermin. Vermin are a major source of crop damage, as they are known to cause structural damage and spread disease. Mice spread disease through their feces and are often carriers of parasites. In North America, breathing dust that has come in contact with mouse excrement has been linked to hantavirus, which may lead to hantavirus pulmonary syndrome (HPS).

Primarily nocturnal animals, mice compensate for their poor eyesight with a keen sense of hearing. They depend on their sense of smell to locate food and avoid predators.

In the wild, mice are known to build intricate burrows. These burrows have long entrances and are equipped with escape tunnels. In at least one species, the architectural design of a burrow is a genetic trait.

Types of animals known as mice
The most common mice are murines, in the same clade as common rats. They are murids, along with gerbils and other close relatives. 
order Dasyuromorphia
marsupial mice, smaller species of Dasyuridae
order Rodentia
suborder Castorimorpha
 family Heteromyidae
 Kangaroo mouse, genus Microdipodops
 Pocket mouse, tribe Perognathinae
 Spiny pocket mouse, genus Heteromys
suborder Anomaluromorpha
 family Anomaluridae
 flying mouse
suborder Myomorpha
 family Cricetidae
 Brush mouse, Peromyscus boylii
 Florida mouse
 Golden mouse
 American harvest mouse, genus Reithrodontomys
 Voles Often referred to as "Field or Meadow mice"
 family Muridae
 typical mice, the genus Mus
 Field mice, genus Apodemus
 Wood mouse, Apodemus sylvaticus
 Yellow-necked mouse, Apodemus flavicollis
 Large Mindoro forest mouse
 Big-eared hopping mouse
 Luzon montane forest mouse
 Forrest's mouse
 Pebble-mound mouse
 Bolam's mouse
 Eurasian harvest mouse, genus Micromys

Emotions
Researchers at the Max Planck Institute of Neurobiology have confirmed that mice have a range of facial expressions. They used machine vision to spot familiar human emotions like pleasure, disgust, nausea, pain, and fear.

Diet
In nature, mice are largely herbivores, consuming any kind of fruit or grain from plants. However, mice adapt well to urban areas and are known for eating almost all types of food scraps. In captivity, mice are commonly fed commercial pelleted mouse diet. These diets are nutritionally complete, but they still need a large variety of vegetables.

Despite popular belief, most mice do not have a special appetite for cheese. They will only eat cheese for lack of better options.

Human use

As experimental animals 

Mice are common experimental animals in laboratory research of biology and psychology fields primarily because they are mammals, and also because they share a high degree of homology with humans. They are the most commonly used mammalian model organism, more common than rats. The mouse genome has been sequenced, and virtually all mouse genes have human homologs. The mouse has approximately 2.7 billion base pairs and 20 pairs of chromosomes.
They can also be manipulated in ways that are illegal with humans, although animal rights activists often object. A knockout mouse is a genetically modified mouse that has had one or more of its genes made inoperable through a gene knockout.

Reasons for common selection of mice are that they are small and inexpensive, have a widely varied diet, are easily maintained, and can reproduce quickly. Several generations of mice can be observed in a relatively short time. Mice are generally very docile if raised from birth and given sufficient human contact. However, certain strains have been known to be quite temperamental.

As pets 

Many people buy mice as companion pets. They can be playful, loving and can grow used to being handled. Like pet rats, pet mice should not be left unsupervised outside as they have many natural predators, including (but not limited to) birds, snakes, lizards, cats, and dogs. Male mice tend to have a stronger odor than the females.  However, mice are careful groomers and as pets they never need bathing.  Well looked-after mice can make ideal pets. Some common mouse care products are:
 Cage – Usually a hamster or gerbil cage, but a variety of special mouse cages are now available. Most should have a secure door.
 Food – Special pelleted and seed-based food is available. Mice can generally eat most rodent food (for rats, mice, hamsters, gerbils, etc.)
 Bedding – Usually made of hardwood pulp, such as aspen, sometimes from shredded, uninked paper or recycled virgin wood pulp. Using corn husk bedding is avoided because it promotes Aspergillus fungus, and can grow mold once it gets wet, which is rough on their feet.

As feed 

Mice are a staple in the diet of many small carnivores. In various countries mice are used as feed for pets such as snakes, lizards, frogs, tarantulas, and birds of prey, and many pet stores carry mice for this purpose. Such mice are sold in various sizes and with various amounts of fur. Mice without fur are easier for the animal to consume; however, mice with fur may be more convincing as animal feed.

As food 
Humans have eaten mice since prehistoric times. In Victorian Britain, fried mice were still given to children as a folk remedy for bed-wetting; while Jared Diamond reports creamed mice being used in England as a dietary supplement during WW II rationing. Mice are a delicacy throughout eastern Zambia and northern Malawi, where they are a seasonal source of protein. Field rat is a popular food in Vietnam and neighboring countries. In many countries, however, mouse is no longer a food item.

Prescribed cures in Ancient Egypt included mice as medicine. In Ancient Egypt, when infants were ill, mice were eaten as treatment by their mothers. It was believed that mouse eating by the mother would help heal the baby who was ill.

See also
 List of fictional mice and rats
 Mousetrap
 Musophobia (fear of mice)
 Mouse brain development timeline
 Fe, Fi, Fo, Fum, and Phooey, mice who orbited the Moon 75 times in 1972 on Apollo 17

References

External links

 Fancy Mice: extensive information about breeding mice and keeping them as pets
 High-resolution images of cross sections of mice brains
 History of the mouse (with focus on their use in genetics studies)
 Mouse tracks: How to identify mouse tracks

Mammal common names
Rodents
Mice
Animals bred for albinism on a large scale